Ihururu is a settlement in Kenya's Central Province with a population of approximately 1,200 in 1994.

References 

Populated places in Central Province (Kenya)